Diamonds in the Coal is The Badlees first full-length album, recorded in late 1991 and released in January 1992. It is the first to feature Paul Smith on bass. The album is an entertaining and thoughtful album that split the difference between accessible pop songs and deeper message-oriented folk and roots rock.

Background
With the addition of Smith on bass, the Badlees quintet that would drive through their most productive years was now intact. The Badlees were now ready to start work on their first full-length album. Dedicated to performing original music, it was now time to expand their library and this would be accomplished in 1991 through the prolific songwriting of Bret Alexander, Mike Naydock, and to a smaller extent, Jeff Feltenberger.

The result is Diamonds in the Coal which, thematically, is nearly sliced in half by the light intermission of "Badlee Rap", performed by rapper Loose Bruce, while doing a session at Waterfront Studios in Hoboken, New Jersey. Songs previous to this on the album are mainly pop-oriented with strong hooks such as on the opener "Like a Rembrandt", which The Album Network picked up for its latest compilation. There’s also the crisp rocker "Just One Moment", the mellow ballad "The Real Thing", and the most infectious tune on the album, "Back Where We Came From" (commonly referred to as "The Na Na Song"). This latter song was the band's first single from the album and was added to the regular rotation of several Pennsylvania rock-formatted radio stations. It features a comical monologue in the bridge section by Mike Naydock, his only appearance on a Badlees record as a performer; the monologue is actually a quote from the Minutemen song "#1 Hit Song" from Double Nickels on the Dime.

The second "half" of the album contains songs that, while still very pop-sensible and accessible, explored deeper subject matter and richer musical structure. The upbeat "Dirty Neon Times" includes some fantastic vocal harmonies by Jeff Feltenberger, while "Spending My Inheritance" is a well composed "people’s anthem" that includes harmonica by Bret Alexander and some fiddle-playing by guest performer David Rose. Perhaps the most unusual song on the album is the smooth, atmospheric "Sister Shirley", which includes a picturesque lyrical narrative by Naydock and some sweet, jazzy lead guitar by Alexander.

But the true masterpiece of Diamonds in the Coal is the closing song of the same name, which brings the listener into the dark, forgotten patch towns of Pennsylvania's Anthracite Region. The imagery in this song's lyric is so vivid that you can almost feel the coal dust flying, while the music sets the perfect scene with a methodic, marching rhythm by Ron Simasek on the bottom end and some authentic, ethnic instrumentation up above.
  
"There are few things easier than to live badly and die well"

This quote by Oscar Wilde was placed inner sleeve of Diamonds in the Coal, obviously because of the play on the band's name, but this was not the only quote on the album. Each song on the lyrics page contained its own special quote from philosophers and artists ranging from Aristotle to Andy Warhol. These extra features show the T-L-C and attention to detail the Badlees put into the creation of the "album" – their very first. Simasek also located the pictures that were used for the cover and within the packaging, authentic early 20th century miner photos, from the Tamaqua (PA) Historical Society. These images would also be used in band promotions around the time of the album's release in January 1992.

Track listing

Personnel
The Badlees
 Pete Palladino – Lead vocals
 Bret Alexander – Electric guitar, harmonica, mandolin, vocals
 Jeff Feltenberger – Acoustic guitar, vocals
 Paul Smith – Bass, keyboards, vocals
 Ron Simasek – Drums, percussion

Additional musicians
 Doug Kennedy - Guitar solo on "The Next Big Thing"
 David Rose - Violin on "Spending My Inheritance" and "Diamonds in the Coal"
 Loose Bruce - Vocals on "Badlee Rap"
 Mike Naydock - Monolog on "Back Where We Come From"

Production
 Bret Alexander – Producer, engineer
 Anthony & JoAnn Palladino - Executive producer
 Doug Conroy, Greg DiGesu, and Jeff Mauriello - Engineers at Waterfront Recording
 Paul Smith & Scott Berger - Engineers at Susquehanna Sound
 Donna Glass - Layout and design
 Terry Selders - Management
 Mark Mattocks, Al Skiles, and J.D. Dumas - Live Sound

References

Modern Rock Review Badlees Profile, October 10, 2010
The Badlees Archives by Alan K. Stout
"Diamonds in the Coal", Pennsylvania Musician Vol.XI #1 (p. 11), January 1992
"PA Releases Reviews" by Bryan G. Woleslagle, Pennsylvania Musician Vol.XI #3 (p. 20), March 1992
"Badlees are Branching Out" by David Donati, Wilkes-Barre Times Leader (p. 8B), May 5, 1992

1992 albums
The Badlees albums